St. Mary's Mission  was a Jesuit mission founded in 1847 along the Oregon Trail. The Pottawatomie Indian Pay Station was built in 1855 for use by government agents to pay an annuity to the Pottawatomie Indians who relocated to the area from the Great Lakes region. The city of St. Marys, Kansas was established around the mission. During the 19th and 20th centuries Native American children were often forced to attend Mission schools like St. Mary's. Potawatomi children were taken from their families in the 1860s and sent to St. Mary's Mission where they were left in the care of White Americans.

In popular culture
St. Mary's Mission is one of the stops in the video game Oregon Trail II.

See also
 List of Jesuit sites

External links 
 History of The City of St. Marys

Jesuit churches in the United States
Former Roman Catholic church buildings in Kansas
Oregon Trail
Churches in the Roman Catholic Archdiocese of Kansas City in Kansas
Religious organizations established in 1847
1847 establishments in Indian Territory
Potawatomi
Native American history of Kansas